Roberts Locāns (born March 3, 1996) is a Latvian professional ice hockey right winger. He is currently a free agent having last played for the Knoxville Ice Bears of the Southern Professional Hockey League.

Locāns played 19 games for Dinamo Riga during the 2015–16 KHL season, registering two assists.

References

External links

1996 births
Living people
Dinamo Riga players
Hokki players
Iisalmen Peli-Karhut players
KeuPa HT players
Knoxville Ice Bears (SPHL) players
Latvian ice hockey right wingers
Norfolk Admirals (ECHL) players
Prizma Riga players
HK Riga players
Roanoke Rail Yard Dawgs players
Ice hockey people from Riga